Hudson Place may refer to:
Hudson Place (Manhattan), a street in the Hudson Yards Redevelopment Project
Hudson Place (Hoboken), a short street near Hoboken Terminal